Social networking software provides the technological basis for community driven content sharing and social networking.

See also Comparison of software and protocols for distributed social networking, especially for open-source software. Comparison of microblogging and similar services may also be relevant.

Social networking software comparison

References 

Social networking software

Social networking